Chichele is a surname. Notable people with the surname include:

Henry Chichele ( 1364–1443), English religious leader
Chichele Professorship
Thomas Chichele (1614–1699), English politician

See also
Chicheley (disambiguation)